This is a list of notable past and present residents of the U.S. city of Stockton, California, and its surrounding metropolitan area. People born in Stockton are printed in bold.

Arts

 Willis E. Davis (1855–1910), landscape painter, clubman, banker
 David Haskell (1948–2000), film, stage and television actor
 Taylor Mac (born 1973), playwright, actor, performance artist
 Bob Montana (1920–1975), comic artist, cartoonist
 Kara Walker (born 1969), contemporary artist
 Neck Face (born 1984), anonymous graffiti artist

Athletics

 Ricky Barnes (born 1981), professional golfer
 Greg Bishop (born 1971), NFL offensive tackle
 Dallas Braden (born 1983), MLB pitcher             
 Pete Carroll (born 1951), NFL coach (attended and coached at University of the Pacific)
 Erik Centeno (born 2002), soccer player for Atlanta United
 Brandin Cooks (born 1993), NFL wide receiver for the Los Angeles Rams 
 Nate Diaz (born 1985), mixed martial artist
 Nick Diaz (born 1983), mixed martial artist, Former Strikeforce Welterweight Champion
Dennis Edwards  (born 1959), NFL defensive end
 Frederick Feary (1912–1994), boxer, 1932 U.S. Amateur champion and Olympic bronze medalist
 Cathy Ferguson (born 1948), swimmer, 2-time Olympic gold medalist
 Conn Findlay (1930–2021), 2-time Olympic gold medalist rower and sailor (America's Cup)
 Ed Fisher (born 1949), NFL and USFL guard 
 Jacki Gemelos (born 1983), WNBA player
 John Gianelli (born 1950), pro basketball player
 Brian Goodell (born 1959), Olympic gold medalist and world record-holding swimmer
 Eddie Guardado (born 1970), MLB relief pitcher
 Wayne Hardin (born 1927), College Football Hall of Fame at Navy and Temple (attended and coached at University of the Pacific)
 Willard Harrell (born 1952), NFL running back
 Von Hayes (born 1958), MLB outfielder
 J. D. Hill (born 1948), NFL wide receiver
 Dan Inosanto (born 1936), martial arts instructor
 Hue Jackson (born 1965), NFL coach (attended and coached at University of the Pacific)
 Trumaine Johnson (born 1990), NFL cornerback
 Derek Kennard (born 1962), NFL guard and center
 Dean Kremer (born 1996), Israeli-American MLB starting pitcher
 Mike Macfarlane (born 1964), MLB catcher
 Doug Martin (born 1989), NFL running back
 James Nunnally (born 1990), pro basketball player
 Brian Peets (born 1956), NFL tight end
 Mike Pereira, NFL vice president of officiating, rules analyst for Fox Sports
 Pete Morelli (born 1951), NFL referee
 Louis Rankin (born 1985), NFL and CFL running back
 Jose Rojas (born 1990), racquetball player 
 Webster Slaughter (born 1964), NFL wide receiver
 Andre Spencer (1964–2020), basketball player
 Ed Sprague Jr. (born 1967),  MLB third baseman
 Amos Alonzo Stagg (1862–1965), pioneer of college football, coach at University of the Pacific
 Julius Thomas (born 1988), NFL tight end
 Eric Williams (born 1962), NFL defensive lineman
 Dolores Wilson (born 1928), All-American Girls Professional Baseball League outfielder
 Jim Winn (born 1959), MLB relief pitcher
 Kenny Wooten (born 1998), NBA power forward

Business

 Melvin Belli (1907–1996), lawyer known as "The King of Torts"
 Benjamin Holt (1849–1920), inventor and founder of Holt Manufacturing Company
 Tillie Ehrlich Lewis (1901–1977), businesswoman, founder of Tillie Lewis Foods
 Robert Six (1907–1986), former CEO of Continental Airlines
 Edwin Lewis Snyder (1887–1969), architect
 Alex Spanos (1923–2018), businessman, owner of Los Angeles Chargers
 Dean Spanos (born 1950), president of Los Angeles Chargers

Literature

 Dennis Etchison (born 1943), novelist
 Leonard Gardner (born 1933), novelist, screenwriter
 Daniel Goleman (born 1946), author, psychologist, and science journalist
 Maxine Hong Kingston (born 1940), author, feminist
 Brandon Leake (born 1992), spoken word poet, winner of America's Got Talent
 Janice Mirikitani (1941–2021), Sansei poet, activist
 Howard Pease (1894-1974), writer of adventure stories for juveniles
 Anthony Veasna So (1992–2020), Khmer American author

Movies/television/media

 Walter Anthony (1872–1945), screenwriter
 Dennis Dun (born 1952), actor
 Santino Fontana (born 1982), actor 
 Cay Forrester (1921–2005), actress
 Chase Hudson   (born 2002), social media personality
 Mark Gantt (born 1968), actor, producer
 Lamont Johnson (1922–2010), actor, director
 Janet Leigh (1927–2004), actress 
 Taylor Mac (born 1973), actor, playwright, performance artist, director
 Dolores Moran (1926–1982), actress and model
 Jazz Raycole (born 1988), actress, dancer
 Ross Thomas (born 1981), actor, filmmaker

Music

 Ace Andres (born 1958), guitarist, singer/songwriter
 Chi Cheng  (1970–2013), guitarist, musician/poet
 Dave Brubeck (1920–2012), jazz pianist and composer 
 Shannon Curtis, musician, singer/songwriter
 Gil Evans (1912–1988), musician, pianist, composer
 Chris Isaak (born 1956), musician, singer/songwriter
 Hallway Productionz (formed 2002), music producers Teak & Dejon Underdue
 Scott Kannberg (born 1966), musician
 Stephen Malkmus (born 1966), musician
 Pavement (formed 1989), indie rock band
 Grant-Lee Phillips (born 1963), musician, singer/songwriter
 Cliffie Stone (1917–1998), musician, country singer
 Jasmine Sandlas (born 1985), Punjabi singer, songwriter, rapper
 Randy Stonehill (born 1952), guitarist, singer/songwriter
 Savage Sun (born 1972), rapper
 Gary Young (born 1953), musician

Politics

 Raymond Cox (1951–2017), Minnesota state legislator and businessman
 Dolores Huerta (born 1930), labor leader and civil rights activist, co-founder of the United Farm Workers
 Larry Itliong (1913–1977), Filipino American labor leader and union partner of Cesar Chavez
 David S. Terry (1823–1889), 4th Chief Justice of California
 Anthony Silva (politician), former mayor

Science
Arthur O. Austin' {1879-1964), engineer and inventor
Richard O. Buckius (born 1950), engineer and Chief Operating Officer of the National Science Foundation
José M. Hernández (born 1962), engineer and NASA astronaut

Miscellaneous

 Harriet Chalmers Adams (1875–1937), explorer, writer, and photographer
 Larry Fortensky (1952–2016), final husband of Elizabeth Taylor
 Jeremy Meeks (born 1984), fashion model, former gang member
 Richard A. Pittman (1945–2016), United States Marine, Medal of Honor recipient
 Kristin Smart, 1995, missing person

References 

 
Stockton, California
Stockton